Marianne Gossweiler (born 15 May 1943 in Schaffhausen) is a Swiss equestrian. She placed seventh in individual dressage and won a silver medal in team dressage at the 1964 Summer Olympics in Tokyo. She a won bronze medal in team dressage at the 1968 Summer Olympics. She is married to sports rower Urs Fankhauser.

References

External links

1943 births
Living people
Swiss female equestrians
Swiss dressage riders
Olympic equestrians of Switzerland
Olympic silver medalists for Switzerland
Olympic bronze medalists for Switzerland
Equestrians at the 1964 Summer Olympics
Equestrians at the 1968 Summer Olympics
Olympic medalists in equestrian
People from Schaffhausen
Sportspeople from the canton of Schaffhausen
Medalists at the 1968 Summer Olympics
Medalists at the 1964 Summer Olympics
20th-century Swiss women